Pursegloveia is a genus of flowering plants belonging to the subfamily Aroideae in the family Araceae.

Its native range is Borneo.

Species:

Pursegloveia aegis 
Pursegloveia ashtonii 
Pursegloveia burttii 
Pursegloveia kazuyae 
Pursegloveia minima 
Pursegloveia orientalis

References

Araceae
Araceae genera